The Mendenhall River (Lingít: Woosh Ilʼóox̱ʼu Héen) is an Alaskan river north of Juneau in the Mendenhall Valley.  The river begins at the Mendenhall Lake, at the base of the Mendenhall Glacier.

Rafting on the river
The Mendenhall is about six miles (9 kilometers) long, one mile (1.6 km) of which is whitewater.  The most favorable months in which to raft on the river is May through September.  The most active points along the whitewater section are Scott's Iatola (or Iatolla) Hola, Tourist Trap, and Pinball Alley.  The whitewater ends near the Juneau International Airport.

Flooding
Minor flood stage for the Mendenhall River is 12 feet (3.7 m), and a level of 14 feet (4.3 m) is more likely to cause extensive problems.  If the Mendenhall is at minor flood stage, however, it is likely that areas such as Montana Creek, Jordan Creek, and the Mendenhall Lake are also experiencing flooding at that time.

Interesting facts
On October 20, 1998, the river reached its greatest-recorded water flow of 12,400 cubic feet per second (350 m³/s).
Named in honor of Thomas Corwin Mendenhall, the superintendent of the U.S. Coast and Geodetic Survey (1889–1894).

Points of interest
Brotherhood Bridge

See also
List of Alaska rivers
Mendenhall Glacier
Mendenhall River Community School
Mendenhall Wetlands State Game Refuge
Thomas Corwin Mendenhall

External links
Hydrology, Geomorphology, and Flood Profiles -- (full report is a PDF file)
Facing the "Iatolla Hola"—September 4, 2001 article in the on-line version of the Juneau Empire
Mendenhall River on E-RAFT.com
Rafting picture
Juneau areas at risk of floods
Mendenhall Wetlands State Game Refuge

Rivers of Alaska
Rivers of Juneau, Alaska